Fabulous Disaster is the third studio album by American thrash metal band Exodus. It was released on January 30, 1989 on the UK label Music for Nations, while the US version was released on Combat/Relativity Records. In 1999, Century Media remastered and reissued the band's first three albums in Europe only.

Fabulous Disaster was Tom Hunting's last release with Exodus until the 1997 live album Another Lesson in Violence. Additionally, it was the first Exodus album not to feature a lineup change from after one consecutive studio album, and one of two albums to include two song covers (the other being 1992's Force of Habit).

Tour
Exodus toured for five months to promote Fabulous Disaster. The band embarked on a month-long European tour with Nuclear Assault and Acid Reign. In the spring of 1989, Exodus landed a supporting slot for the Headbangers Ball tour with Anthrax and Helloween, exposing the band to a wide thrash metal audience. Exodus then embarked on another North American tour, which lasted from May to July 1989; supporting acts were Sick of It All, Faith or Fear, Forbidden, Dead Orchestra and Wehrmacht. The band wrapped up the tour at The Fillmore on July 14, 1989; this show was recorded on the band's first live album Good Friendly Violent Fun, which was released two years later.

Reception

In a contemporary review, Kerrang! journalist Don Kaye praised the album and paired it to Bonded by Blood for confidence and aggression, qualities which were slightly missing in Pleasures of the Flesh. He judged Fabulous Disaster as "one of the very best of the genre in 1989."

Fabulous Disaster received a positive modern review from AllMusic's Eduardo Rivadavia, who stated that Exodus "went on to create their most diverse and carefully conceived effort yet, while remaining faithful to their no-frills thrash ethic." He then added that "the album represented the realization of their vision, as well as their commercial peak" but "still failed to gain them their well-deserved place alongside such thrash metal giants as Megadeth, Metallica, Anthrax and Slayer." By contrast, Canadian journalist Martin Popoff remarked how Exodus remained the "last custodians of a manic but toneless thrash, high on allegiance, low on hummability" and easily forgettable.

Fabulous Disaster debuted at No. 82 on the Billboard 200. No singles were released to promote the album, but the songs "Toxic Waltz" and "Low Rider" got regular airplay on radio stations, including Los Angeles, California radio station KNAC. A video was made for "The Toxic Waltz", which received a good amount of airplay on MTV's Headbangers Ball.  The lead off track, "The Last Act of Defiance" was inspired by the New Mexico State Penitentiary riot that took place in February 1980.

Track listing

Personnel
Exodus
Steve "Zetro" Souza – vocals
Gary Holt – guitars
Rick Hunolt – guitars
Rob McKillop – bass
Tom Hunting – drums

Additional musicians
Dov Christopher – intro vocals on track 1, harmonica on track 5
Brian Mantilla – additional percussion on track 4

Production
Marc Senesac – production, engineering, mixing
Gary Holt – production, mixing
Rick Hunolt – production, mixing
David Plank – engineering
Chad Munsey – mixing assistant 
Bernie Grundman – mastering

Charts

References

External links
"Fabulous Disaster" at discogs

1989 albums
Exodus (American band) albums
Relativity Records albums
Music for Nations albums
Combat Records albums